Martin Oliver may refer to:
 Martin Oliver (author), British author of children's books
 Martin Oliver (baseball), American baseball player
 Martin Oliver (captain), captain of the brig, St. John, fl. 1849
 Martin Oliver (Claddagh), sailor and King of the Claddagh, c. 1961–1972